Demino is a rural locality (a village) in Kichmengskoye Rural Settlement, Kichmengsko-Gorodetsky District, Vologda Oblast, Russia. The population was 31 as of 2002.

Geography 
Demino is located 34 km southwest of Kichmengsky Gorodok (the district's administrative centre) by road. Plostiyevo is the nearest rural locality.

References 

Rural localities in Kichmengsko-Gorodetsky District